Prabhunath College, Parsa is a degree college in Parsa, Bihar. It is a constituent unit of Jai Prakash University. College offers Intermediate and Three years Degree Course (TDC) in Arts and Science.

History 
College was established in the year 1958.

Departments 

 Arts
 Hindi
 Urdu
  English
 Philosophy
 Economics
 Political Science
 History
 Science
 Mathematics
 Physics
 Chemistry
 Zoology
 Botany

References

External links 

 Jai Prakash University website

Universities and colleges in Bihar
Constituent colleges of Jai Prakash University
Educational institutions established in 1958
1958 establishments in Bihar